Broady Valley is a steeply inclined valley,  long, lying west of Lanyon Peak in the Saint Johns Range of Victoria Land. The valley opens southwest to the snout of the Victoria Upper Glacier. Named by the New Zealand Geographic Board in 2005 after Paul Broady, University of Melbourne (later University of Canterbury), a microbial biologist who worked with the New Zealand Antarctic Research Programme for eight seasons from 1981, at McMurdo Dry Valleys, Ross Island, Marie Byrd Land and other areas; with the British Antarctic Survey at Signy Island in the 1970s, and with the Australian National Antarctic Research Expeditions in the early 1980s.

References

Valleys of Victoria Land